Radha Krishna Temple (RKT) of Dallas is a Hindu temple located in Allen, Texas. It was established by JKYog, under the leadership of Swami Mukundananda.

The opening ceremonies and consecration (Pratiṣṭhavidhi) were held over eight days, 4–11 July 2017. The ceremony was attended by the mayors of Allen and Frisco, other dignitaries, and thousands of people from the nearby community. Life-sized statues of Radha and Krishna were unveiled on 9 July 2017. Statues of Ram, Sita, Hanuman, and Ganesh were later added.

The temple was built according to guidelines for temple architecture set out in the Shilpa Shastra.

Radha Krishna Temple celebrates all the major Hindu festivals such as Diwali, Holi, and Radhastami. The temple also has cultural events such as Sanskriti and Yoga. The temple also offers multiple classes like Hindi, Programming, and Toastmasters.

The construction of the Center for Education and Culture started in May 2020 with Bhoomi Poojan ceremony. The 20,000 square feet building will have facilities for cultural programs, wedding ceremonies, youth leadership workshops, children's classes, yoga, meditation classes, and other community activities.

External links
 Radha Krishna Temple

References

2017 establishments in Texas
Radha Krishna temples
Krishna temples
Hindu temples in Texas
Indian-American culture in Texas
Religious buildings and structures completed in 2017
Buildings and structures in Collin County, Texas